Genekolob is a rural locality (a selo) in Kamilukhsky Selsoviet, Tlyaratinsky District, Republic of Dagestan, Russia. The population was 753 as of 2010. There are 3 streets.

Geography 
Genekolob is located 42 km southeast of Tlyarata (the district's administrative centre) by road. Kamilukh is the nearest rural locality.

References 

Rural localities in Tlyaratinsky District